Axel Michon (born 16 December 1990) is a French professional tennis player.

Junior career

Professional career

2014
Axel lost in the second round of qualifying at the Australian Open. He made his first appearance in the main draw of a Grand Slam event at the French Open, where he received a wildcard. He won his first round match against Bradley Klahn, before losing in the second round against 19th seed Kevin Anderson in straight sets.

ATP Challengers and ITF Futures finals

Singles (15 titles, 11 runners-up)

Doubles (1 title, 3 runners-up)

Singles performance timeline

Note: Only results from the Grand Slams, ATP World Tour Masters 1000, ATP World Tour Finals, Summer Olympics and Davis Cup are listed in an ATP player's performance timeline.  Qualifying matches and walkovers are neither official match wins nor losses. This table is current through the 2015 US Open.

Notes

References

External links
 
 
 

1990 births
Living people
French male tennis players
Tennis players from Paris